Joseph Stanley Williams (born September 1, 1960) is an American singer, songwriter and film score composer, best known for his work in the rock band Toto, which he fronted as lead vocalist from 1986 to 1988, 2010 to 2019 and again since 2020. He is a son of film composer John Williams and actress Barbara Ruick and a grandson of jazz drummer Johnny Williams and actors Melville Ruick and Lurene Tuttle.

Career

Toto

Williams was the lead vocalist for Toto during the mid-to-late 1980s and was featured on the albums Fahrenheit (1986) and The Seventh One (1988) before leaving due to personal problems. He can also be heard on the album Toto XX (1998), a compilation of rare and unreleased tracks. He is featured on Toto's 2006 album, Falling in Between, sharing lead vocals with Steve Lukather on "Bottom of Your Soul". In addition to his guest spot on Falling in Between, Williams was a guest singer at several Toto concerts.

Williams rejoined Toto upon its reformation in 2010 and performed on the band's recent live albums and the 2015 studio album Toto XIV. When the group disbanded in 2019 and subsequently reformed in 2020, Williams was the only member from the previous lineup besides Lukather and touring members Warren Ham and Dominique "Xavier" Taplin to return.

Solo work as a singer
Williams released his first, self-titled solo album in 1982. After his initial tenure with Toto, he has released several more. Many of Toto's members have contributed to his solo work over the years. In 2003, he released an album called Vertigo, a project he initiated, but where he was not in full charge of the production, only recording and supplying the vocals. The second Vertigo album, Vertigo 2, was released in 2006. Williams released an album of cover songs from renowned artists such as Elton John, Bryan Adams, Diane Warren, and Kevin Cronin in 2006 called Two of Us, featuring piano and voice only. He returned with two more voice and piano albums in 2007, Smiles and Tears, also consisting of classic hits by popular artists. His latest solo album containing original songs, This Fall, was released in November 2008.

Work as a film composer
Joseph Williams has also been busy as a composer of film and drama scores, most notably for episodes of the science fiction series Roswell, and The Lyon's Den starring Rob Lowe. 

He was the writer of the original English lyrics for the songs "Lapti Nek" and "Ewok Celebration" from the original 1983 release of Return of the Jedi, which was scored and conducted by his father, John Williams. Both songs were replaced with other compositions in the 1997 Special Edition. He collaborated again with his father on the releases of 1999's The Phantom Menace and the 2002's Attack of the Clones. In the former he helped compose Augie's Great Municipal Band which appears during the ending of the film and in the latter 2M4, an untitled composition that appears during the Dex's Diner sequence.

In 2003, he was nominated for an Emmy Award for "Outstanding Main Title Theme Music" for the TV series Miracles. The music to the CBS miniseries Category 7: The End of the World and the TV film Momentum were composed by him.

Session work
Williams has been in demand as a session vocalist and can be heard on numerous projects by other artists, as well as on movie soundtracks. In 1985 he sang the vocals for the theme song of the animated TV series Disney's Adventures of the Gummi Bears. He provided backing vocals on Peter Cetera's album World Falling Down and co-wrote the song "Man in Me", lead vocals for three tracks – "Walk the Wire", "History" and "When You Look in My Eyes" – to Jay Graydon's Airplay for the Planet album, subsequently touring with the band and backing vocals on Jon Anderson's In the City of Angels in 1988, most prominently on the song "Top of the World (The Glass Bead Game)". In Disney's animated feature film The Lion King, he can be heard as the singing voice of the Adult Simba, singing on the songs "Hakuna Matata" and "Can You Feel the Love Tonight". He reprised this singing role in the direct-to-video animated film Mickey's Magical Christmas: Snowed in at the House of Mouse. In 1997 and 1998 respectively, he shared vocal duties on two albums by the a cappella covers group The West Coast All Stars, the other vocalists being Bobby Kimball, Bill Champlin and Jason Scheff, whereas Tommy Funderburk replaced Champlin on the Naturally album. He sings background vocals on Chicago's "King of Might Have Been" on the 2006 album Chicago XXX as well as on "Let's Take a Lifetime" on the 1993-recorded/2008-released album Chicago XXXII: Stone of Sisyphus. The song "What You're Missing" from the Chicago album Chicago 16 was co-written by him. He also sings backing vocals on five tracks from Steve Lukather's solo album Ever Changing Times in addition to lending his vocals to another of Lukather's solo albums, All's Well That Ends Well.

Discography

Toto albums
1986: Fahrenheit
1988: The Seventh One
1998: Toto XX (lead vocals on "Last Night" and “In A Word”)
2006: Falling in Between (co-lead vocals on "Bottom Of Your Soul")
2015: Toto XIV
2018: Old Is New

Solo albums
1982: Joseph Williams (re-released 2002)
1996: I Am Alive
1997: 3
1999: Early Years
2003: Vertigo
2006: Two of Us
2006: Vertigo 2
2007: Smiles
2007: Tears
2008: This Fall
2021: Denizen Tenant

with Peter Friestedt
2011: Williams/Friestedt

with CWF - Bill Champlin / Peter Friestedt / Joseph Williams 
2015: CWF
2018: 10 Miles
2020: CWF 2

Guest vocals (excerpt)
1983: Lapti Nek (Urth)
1984: Which One of Us Is Me (Jay Gruska)
1985: Save the Night (The Goonies soundtrack)
1985: Sleepess Nights (Alan Gorrie)
1985: Disney's Adventures of the Gummi Bears (Theme Song Vocals)
1988: In the City of Angels (Jon Anderson)
1989: My Heart in Red (Ijiima Mari)
1990: Tatsuro Songs from L.A. (Compilation)
1990: Toy Matinee (Toy Matinee)
1991: Tatsuro Songs from L.A. 2 (Compilation)
1991: Fade in Love (Compilation)
1992: Re-Import (Compilation)
1992: Goody's (Compilation)
1992: The Radical Light (Vonda Shepard)
1993: Airplay for the Planet (Jay Graydon)
1993: L.A. Cowboys / Endless Summer (Compilation)
1994: Love Stories 3 (Compilation)
1994: The Lion King (Original Movie Soundtrack)
1997: California Dreamin (West Coast All Stars)
1998: Naturally (West Coast All Stars)
1999: ELT Songs from L.A. (Compilation) 
1999: In a Dream (Lionel's Dad)
2001: Radioactive (Ceremony Of Innocence)
2002: LA Project (Peter Friestedt)
2006: Avalon (The Richie Zito Project)
2008: LA Project II (Peter Friestedt)
2008: Holy God (Brian Doerksen)
2014: My Kind O' Lovin''' (Intelligent Music Project II)
2015: Touching the Divine (Intelligent Music Project III)
2015: CWF (Champlin, Williams, Friestedt)
2018: 10 Miles/CWF (Champlin, Williams, Friestedt)
2020: CWF II (Champlin, Williams, Friestedt)

Source music (excerpt)
1983: Return of the Jedi'' (lyrics for "Lapti Nek" and an unused source cue)

References

External links

List of songs and scores for film and television written by Joseph Williams

1960 births
Living people
20th-century American composers
20th-century American singers
21st-century American composers
21st-century American singers
American film score composers
American male film score composers
American male pop singers
American male singers
American pop rock singers
American rock singers
John Williams
Musicians from Santa Monica, California
Singers from California
Toto (band) members